Mr. Crawford is the debut studio album by American rapper NoCap. It was released on April 29, 2022, through Atlantic Records and Never Broke Again. The album features production from several established producers in the rap industry such as Einer Bankz, Nick Mira, Take a Daytrip, and Taz Taylor.

Mr. Crawford was supported by five singles: "Vaccine", "Vaccine (Falling Star)", "I'll Be Here", "Shackles to Diamonds", and "Save the Day". The album received generally positive reviews from music critics. It debuted at number eight on the US Billboard 200 chart, earning 29,000 album-equivalent units in its first week.

Background
The album's title relates to NoCap's birth name, Kobe Vidal Crawford.

On March 16, 2022, via Facebook, Cap changed his profile picture to an alternate cover art. NoCap announced the official release of the album via social media on March 28, 2022, while leaving a message for his supporters:

Singles
The album's lead single, "I'll Be Here", was released on February 24, 2022, exclusively on YouTube; however, it was released on all digital platforms on March 15, 2022. The album's second single "Shackles to Diamonds" was released on March 16, 2022. The album's third single "Very Special" was released on April 15, 2022. The album's fourth and final single "Save The Day" featuring Kodak Black was released on April 21, 2022.

Critical reception

Mr. Crawford received positive reviews by music critics. AllMusic compares the album to NoCap's 2020 mixtape Steel Human as they share the same "Auto-Tuned melodies and fluid, quick-switching flows." The review notes that after sampling Jay-Z and Lil Wayne, NoCap "takes enormous steps forward with this debut as he presents more depth and personality than ever before."

Commercial performance
Mr. Crawford debuted at number eight on the US Billboard 200 chart, earning 29,000 album-equivalent units (including 300 copies in pure album sales) in its first week. The album also accumulated a total of 40.07 million on-demand streams of the album's songs.

Track listing

Personnel
Credits adapted from Tidal.
 Al'Geno – mixing (1, 3, 4, 6-14, 16-18, 21), mastering (1, 6-14, 16-18, 21)
 Jason "Cheese" Goldberg – mixing (2, 5, 15, 19, 20), mastering (2-5, 15, 19, 20)

Charts

References

2022 debut albums
Hip hop albums by American artists